The  is a railway line connecting Fukushima Station with the onsen town of Iizaka at Iizaka Onsen Station, all within Fukushima, Fukushima, Japan. It is commonly called  or  locally. This is the only railway line operated by Fukushima Transportation, as the company's main business is bus transport.

History

1920s
The 8.9 km section of tramway track between Fukushima and Iizaka Station (present-day Hanamizuzaka) opened on 13 April 1923. Later on in the year the company was renamed .

1940s–1980s
Izumi Station opened in 1940, and in the following years the section between Fukushima and Moriai (present-day Bijutsukantoshokanmae) was converted to dedicated tramway track. Due to the rebuilding and moving of the track, Moriai was closed then reopened in a new location and Soneda was closed and rebuilt as Dentetsu Fukushima (present-day Soneda). In 1944, Shimizu Yakuba-mae was renamed Iwashiroshimizu. On 1 March 1945, the line was reclassified as a regional railway line.

Carrying capacity on the line was increased with the purchase of brand new 5000 series cars in 1963. Kamimatsukawa Station opened the following year.

Coming into the 1970s, capacity was increased further with the purchase of new 5300 series cars in 1971. The Iizaka East Line closed the same year, leaving the Iizaka Line as the only train line run by Fukushima Transportation. Sakuramizu Station opened in 1975, and three 3300 series cars were purchased from Tokyu in 1976.

In 1980 two more 5000 series cars were acquired from Tokyu, and two years later Iizaka Onsen Station was moved to coincide with the shortening of the line by 100 meters.

1990s–present
1991 saw multiple changes happen to the Iizaka Line, starting out with the renaming of Moriai to Bijutsukantoshokanmae. On 24 June 1991, the overhead catenary power supply was changed from 600 V to 1,500 V DC.

2001 braking accident
At approximately 9:35 pm on April 8, 2001 a train that had departed from Iizaka Onsen in the direction of Fukushima had a brief power outage at Bijutsukantoshokanmae, two stations before Fukushima. When the train resumed operation it was realized that the braking system wasn't operating. The train continued past Soneda, the next station, and crashed through the buffer stop at Fukushima, the end of the line. The train continued for 12 meters further, coming to rest in Fukushima Station's East Building. Four people were injured, none seriously.

It was later discovered that due to improper maintenance, the power outage at Bijutsukantoshokanmae had caused the main brakes to become nonfunctional. The driver had also failed to activate the emergency brakes.

Following the accident, an ATS safety system was installed.

2011 earthquake
All service on the Iizaka Line was shut down in the immediate aftermath of the 2011 Tōhoku earthquake and tsunami, however normal service was restored two days later on March 13.

Stations

Service

While the termini of the Iizaka Line are Fukushima and Iizaka Onsen stations, all trains night at the line's rail yard located at Sakuramizu Station.

Service frequency

Weekdays
As a general rule, trains come every 20–25 minutes in the early morning, every 15 minutes in the morning, every 25 minutes in the daytime, every 15 minutes in the evening, and every 25–30 minutes at night.

Weekends and holidays
As a general rule, trains come every 20–40 minutes in the early morning, every 20 minutes in the morning, every 25 minutes in the daytime, and every 30 minutes at night.

Rolling stock
 1000 series 2/3-car EMUs (since April 2017)
 7000 series 2/3-car EMUs

, services on the line were operated using a fleet of four two-car and two three-car 7000 series stainless steel electric multiple unit (EMU) trains converted from former Tokyu 7000 series EMUs.

In 2017, a number of former Tokyu 1000 series cars were resold to Fukushima Transportation for use on the Iizaka Line.

The three-car sets are mainly used during the weekday morning peak hours only.

7000 series
The 7000 series trains are formed as two- and three-car sets as follows.

Two-car sets

The DeHa 7100 cars each have one lozenge-type pantograph.

Three-car sets

The DeHa 7100 cars each have one lozenge-type pantograph.

Car identities
The former identities of the fleet are as shown below.

1000 series

The 1000 series trains are formed as two- and three-car sets as follows. Two sets (one two-car and one three-car set) were converted in fiscal 2016, entering service on 1 April 2017. Two more sets (one two-car and one three-car set) are scheduled to be introduced during fiscal 2017, followed by two more two-car sets in fiscal 2018, ultimately replacing the entire fleet of 7000 trainsets.

Two-car sets

Three-car sets

Car identities
The former identities of the fleet are as shown below.

See also
List of railway companies in Japan
List of railway lines in Japan

References

Notes

External links 

  

 
Railway lines in Japan
1067 mm gauge railways in Japan
Railway lines opened in 1923
1923 establishments in Japan